AdriPSX ILE is a PlayStation emulator. AdriPSX works in 14 languages. It is able to run PS ONE games from the CDROM as well as CDROM Binary Images (ISOs).

History
 1999 - AdriPSX has been programmed by Roor, the main and only developer of the AdriPSX project, since it was first released at 1999. A member of the site Emutech2K convinced Roor to start developing a PSX emulator and publish it. Fast progress was made through the developing of the emulator, and soon afterwards it began to run its first game. Then Emutech2K closed down, and Roor along with his AdriPSX project moved over to NGemu (regarded as PSXemu). After Zico, the main administrator of NGemu gave the site a makeover, progress of the AdriPSX project was also being made.
 2009 - New AdriPSX Release 1 (unofficial)

Here's a news item from ZDNet: http://downloads.zdnet.com/abstract.aspx?docid=1015751. It appears to be beta. but its out.

Its author founded a company Torum, after cofounding and later abandoning Kaze Networking and Automation SA.
 2012 - Resumed development

After publishing Duos DSEMU, a new Nintendo DS emulator, Roor resumed development on AdriPSX.
New beta release, as well as access to older versions was reestablished on its official blog.

System Requirements 
Minimum

Recommended

AdriPSX ILE runs well on systems with integrated graphics and sound chipsets like Sony's PCV-J150 VAIO computers

References

External links 
 AdriPSX official blog site

PlayStation emulators
Proprietary video game console emulators